Chanda Kangwa (born June 3, 1989) better known by her stage name as DJ Roxy is a Zambian radio disk jockey producer and media consultant. She is most well-known for her career on Radio Phoenix. She is a 2 times winner of the Best Female Radio DJ award at the Mosi Zambian Music Award in 2015 and 2016.  Kangwa has previously worked for Muvi Tv as an assistant producer in 2009.

Life and career 
Kangwa was born in Luanshya the daughter of Michael Kangwa also known as the “Space Kid” who won the 1989 Zambia’s Best Club DJ of the year. In her early teens Kangwa just wanted to be journalist or a singer.

References

Living people
Zambian television personalities
Women in Zambia
1989 births